The 2018 EuroEyes Cyclassics was a road cycling one-day race that took place on 19 August 2018 in Germany. It was the 23rd edition of the EuroEyes Cyclassics and the thirtieth event of the 2018 UCI World Tour. It was won for a second consecutive time by Elia Viviani in a sprint before Arnaud Démare and Alexander Kristoff.

Result

References

2018 UCI World Tour
2018 in German sport
2018
August 2018 sports events in Germany